These are the official results of the Men's 200 metres event at the 2001 IAAF World Championships in Edmonton, Canada. There were a total number of 52 participating athletes, with seven qualifying heats, four quarter-finals, two semi-finals and the final held on Thursday 9 August 2001 at 21:40h.

Medalists

Records

Final

Semi-final
Held on Wednesday 8 August 2001

Quarter-finals
Held on Tuesday 7 August 2001

Heats
Held on Tuesday 7 August 2001

References
 Finals Results
 Semi-finals results
 Quarter-finals results
 Heats results

H
200 metres at the World Athletics Championships